Daniel Herman (born 28 April 1963) is a Czech politician who served as the Minister of Culture of the Czech Republic in Bohuslav Sobotka's Cabinet from 2014 to 2017.

He was born in České Budějovice. His mother was a cousin of Hana Brady. He began studying theology in Litoměřice in 1984. In 1989, he was ordained as a priest. He then became secretary to Miloslav Vlk. He was spokesman of the Czech Bishops' Conference 1996–2005. In 2007, he applied for laicization. He has since worked as a civil servant for the Ministry of the Interior and the Ministry of Culture. From 12 August 2010 to 10 April 2013, he was the Director of the Institute for the Study of Totalitarian Regimes. Since January, 2014, he is Czech Minister of Culture in Bohuslav Sobotka's Cabinet.

In March 2016 preceding state visit of the President of PRC Xi Jinping, he initiated a minute of silence for 1959 Tibetan uprising in Chamber of Deputies followed by the diplomatic note from the Chinese Ambassador.

In May 2016 he caused turmoil due to his visit of congress of the Sudetendeutsche Landsmannschaft as first minister in history of the Government of the Czech Republic.

In October 2016, he caused an international incident by officially welcoming the 14th Dalai Lama after the signing of Czech-Chinese business contracts which do not allow that.

References

External links 
 The Official Website of Daniel Herman

Czech civil servants
20th-century Czech Roman Catholic priests
1963 births
Living people
Laicized Roman Catholic priests
Culture ministers of the Czech Republic
KDU-ČSL Government ministers
Politicians from České Budějovice
Members of the Chamber of Deputies of the Czech Republic (2013–2017)
Knights Commander of the Order of Merit of the Federal Republic of Germany

Czech monarchists